The Greeson-Cone House is a historic house at 928 Center Street in Conway, Arkansas.  It is a -story wood-frame structure with a brick exterior.  It  has a side-gable roof, whose front extends across a porch supported by brick piers near the corners and a square wooden post near the center.  The roof has exposed rafter ends, and a gabled dormer in the Craftsman style.  Built in 1920–21, it is a fine local example of Craftsman architecture.

The house was listed on the National Register of Historic Places in 1995.

See also
National Register of Historic Places listings in Faulkner County, Arkansas

References

Houses on the National Register of Historic Places in Arkansas
Houses completed in 1921
Houses in Conway, Arkansas
National Register of Historic Places in Faulkner County, Arkansas
Individually listed contributing properties to historic districts on the National Register in Arkansas